Van Aert is a Dutch toponymic surname meaning "from Aert", whereby Aert and Aart are spelling variants of the toponym Aard (cf. aarde "earth") with the meaning "cultivated land, ground". Aert and Aart can also be reduced forms of the french male given name Arnout, which gives rise to the etymologically unrelated patronymic surnames Aerts and Aarts.

Notable people with the surname include:
André van Aert (1940), Dutch racing cyclist
Jos van Aert (1962), Dutch racing cyclist
Wout van Aert (1994), Belgian road and cyclo-cross racer

See also 
van Aarde

References

Dutch-language surnames
Toponymic surnames